Jean Freddi Pascal Greco (born 12 February 2001) is an Italian footballer who plays as a midfielder for Vicenza.

Career

Club career
Greco, grew up in the youth academy of Rome, started his career with Italian Serie A side Torino. He was included in Torino's matchday squads on several occasions, but did not appear on the field.

In 2021, he signed for Pordenone in the Italian second tier. After that, Greco was sent on loan to Italian third tier club Catania, where he made 18 league appearances and scored 1 goal. On 4 September 2021, he debuted for Catania during a 2–0 win over Fidelis Andria. On 24 October 2021, Greco scored his first goal for Catania during a 4–1 win over Monterosi. Before the second half of 2021–22, he signed for Vicenza in the Italian second tier. After that, Greco was sent on loan to Italian third tier team Catania once again. Before the season ended, Catania went bankrupt and Greco was allowed to return to Vicenza. He made his Serie B debut for Vicenza on 18 April 2022 against Perugia.

International career
Greco was born in Madagascar, and adopted by an Italian family at the age of 3. He is a youth international for Italy, having represented the Italy U17s, U19s and U20s.

References

External links
 
 FIGC U17 profile
 FIGC U19 profile
 FIGC U20 profile

2001 births
Living people
People from Antananarivo
Italian footballers
Italy youth international footballers
Malagasy footballers
Italian people of Malagasy descent
Association football midfielders
Torino F.C. players
L.R. Vicenza players
Pordenone Calcio players
Catania S.S.D. players
Serie C players
Serie B players